The Holy Single is an EP recording by Kristin Hersh, released in 1995 (see 1995 in music).

Track listing

"Jesus Christ" - 2:25 (Alex Chilton)
"Amazing Grace" - 3:30 (Traditional: Arranged by Kristin Hersh)
"Sinkhole" - 3:14 (W. J. Hersh)
"Can The Circle Be Unbroken" - 2:50 (A. P. Carter)

Personnel
Kristin Hersh - vocals and all instruments

Production
Producer: Kristin Hersh
Engineer: Steve Rizzo
Design: David Narcizo/Mary Ann Southard
Artwork: Dylan Hersh Going

Kristin Hersh albums
1995 EPs